Croydon station is a SEPTA Regional Rail station in Croydon, Pennsylvania. It serves the Trenton Line. It is located at Bristol Pike and Cedar Avenue, and is 19.9 miles from  30th Street Station.

The station is in zone 3 on the Trenton Line, on the Amtrak Northeast Corridor, though Amtrak does not stop there. In 2004, it saw 293 boardings on an average weekday. It was scheduled for renovation in Spring 2009, including an expanded parking lot, covered windscreen shelters, new lighting and raised platforms. Talks of a "super station" were active in 2007–2008 but have not been revisited. Despite the failed proposal to convert Croydon into a super station, Croydon recently underwent a complete upgrade due to infrastructure funding under the recovery act. The two green shelters have been torn down and new raised handicapped accessible platforms have been added, new parking lots have been paved, new lighting has been erected and a new underpass walkway has been added.  The station was completed in the fall of 2011, and the ribbon-cutting ceremony was held on October 28, 2011.

Station layout

References

External links
SEPTA – Croydon Station
Old Croydon PRR Station
YouTube Video (October 4, 2001)
 Station from Google Maps Street View

SEPTA Regional Rail stations
Former Pennsylvania Railroad stations
Railway stations in Bucks County, Pennsylvania
Stations on the Northeast Corridor